Robert Lawrenson (born 12 November 1971) is a British actor known for his role of Declan MacRae on the SyFy show Sanctuary. Appearances include Coronation Street and Smallville. He also works as a film editor and director.

Filmography

References

External links
 

1971 births
English male television actors
Living people
People from Blackpool